Hilde Raupach was a German luger who competed in the late 1920s. She won the women's singles event at the 1928 European luge championships at Schreiberhau, Germany (now Szklarska Poręba, Poland).

References
List of European luge champions 

German female lugers
Year of birth missing
Possibly living people